İzmir, also spelled Izmir, is a metropolitan city on the west coast of Anatolia, and capital of İzmir Province. It is the third most populous city in Turkey, after Istanbul and Ankara, and the largest urban agglomeration on the Aegean Sea.

In 2019, the city of İzmir had a population of 2,965,900, while İzmir Province had a total population of 4,367,251. Its built-up (or metro) area was home to 3,209,179 inhabitants. It extends along the outlying waters of the Gulf of İzmir and inland to the north across the Gediz River Delta; to the east along an alluvial plain created by several small streams; and to slightly more rugged terrain in the south.

İzmir has more than 3,000 years of recorded urban history, and up to 8,500 years of history as a human settlement since the Neolithic period. In classical antiquity the city was known as Smyrna – a name which remained in use in English and various other languages until around 1930, when government efforts led the original Greek name to be gradually phased out internationally in favor of its Turkish counterpart . Until the 1923 population exchange between Greece and Turkey, İzmir had a majority-Greek population.

Lying on an advantageous location at the head of a gulf running down in a deep indentation, midway along the western Anatolian coast, İzmir has been one of the principal mercantile cities of the Mediterranean Sea for much of its history. It hosted the Mediterranean Games in 1971 and the World University Games (Universiade) in 2005. The city participated in Climathon in 2019.

Main features 

İzmir has over 3000 years of recorded urban history and up to 8500 years of history as a human settlement since the Neolithic period. Set in an advantageous location at the head of a gulf in a deep indentation midway along the western Anatolian coast, the city has been one of the principal mercantile ports of the Mediterranean Sea for much of its history. When the Ottomans took over İzmir in the 15th century, they did not inherit compelling historical memories, unlike the other key points of the Ottoman trade network, namely Constantinople (Istanbul), Damascus, Baghdad and Cairo.

The emergence of İzmir as a major international port by the 17th century was largely a result of the attraction it exercised over foreigners and the city's European orientation. Politically, İzmir is considered a stronghold of Kemalism and the Republican People's Party (CHP).

Izmir's port is Turkey's primary port for exports in terms of the freight handled and its free zone, a Turkish-U.S. joint-venture established in 1990, is the leader among the twenty in Turkey. The workforce, and particularly its rising class of young professionals, is concentrated either in the city or in its immediate vicinity (such as in Manisa and Turgutlu), and as either larger companies or SMEs, affirm their names with an increasingly wider global scale and intensity.

İzmir hosted the Mediterranean Games in 1971 and the World University Games (Universiade) in 2005. In March 2008, İzmir submitted its bid to the BIE for hosting the Universal Expo 2015, but it was won by Milan, Italy.

Names and etymology 

In ancient Anatolia, the name of a locality called Ti-smurna is mentioned in some of the Level II tablets from the Assyrian colony in Kültepe (first half of the 2nd millennium BC), with the prefix ti- identifying a proper name, although it is not established with certainty that this name refers to modern-day İzmir.

The modern name İzmir is the Turkish rendering of the Greek name Smyrna and "Smyrne".

The region of İzmir was situated on the southern fringes of the Yortan culture in Anatolia's prehistory, knowledge of which is almost entirely drawn from its cemeteries. In the second half of the 2nd millennium BC, it was in the western end of the extension of the still largely obscure Arzawa Kingdom, an offshoot and usually a dependency of the Hittites, who themselves spread their direct rule as far as the coast during their Great Kingdom. That the realm of the 13th century BC local Luwian ruler, who is depicted in the Kemalpaşa Karabel rock carving at a distance of only  from İzmir was called the Kingdom of Myra may also leave grounds for association with the city's name.

Some would see in the city's name a reference to the name of an Amazon called Smyrna said to have seduced Theseus, leading him to name the city in her honor. Others link the name to the Myrrha commifera shrub, a plant producing the aromatic resin called myrrh that is indigenous to the Middle East and northeastern Africa, which was the city's chief export in antiquity. The Romans took over this name as Smyrna, which is still the name used in English when referring to the city in pre-Turkish times. In Ottoman Turkish the town's name was  Izmīr.

In English, the city was called Smyrna into the 20th century. Izmir (sometimes İzmir) was adopted in English and most foreign languages after Turkey adopted the Latin alphabet in 1928 and urged other countries to use the city's Turkish name. However, the historic name Smyrna is still used today in some languages, such as Italian, and Catalan, Portuguese, and Spanish.

History

Ancient times 

The city is one of the oldest settlements of the Mediterranean basin. The 2004 discovery of Yeşilova Höyük and the neighboring Yassıtepe, in the small delta of Meles River, now the Bornova plain, reset the starting date of the city's past further back than previously thought. Findings from two seasons of excavations carried out in the Yeşilova Höyük by a team of archaeologists from İzmir's Ege University indicate three levels, two of which are prehistoric. Level 2 bears traces of early to mid-Chalcolithic, and Level 3 of Neolithic settlements. These two levels would have been inhabited by the indigenous peoples of the area, very roughly, between the 7th millennium BC to 4th millennium BC. As the seashore receded with time, the site was later used as a cemetery. Several graves containing artifacts dating roughly from 3000 BC, and contemporary with the first city of Troy, were found.

The first settlement to have commanded the Gulf of İzmir as a whole was established on top of Mount Yamanlar, to the northeast of the inner gulf. In connection with the silt brought by the streams which join the sea along the coastline, the settlement to form later the core of "Old Smyrna" was founded on the slopes of the same mountain, on a hill (then a small peninsula connected to the mainland by a small isthmus) in the present-day neighborhood of Tepekule in Bayraklı. The Bayraklı settlement is thought to have stretched back in time as far as the 3rd millennium BC. Archaeological findings of the late Bronze Age show a certain degree of Mycenaean influence in the settlement and the surrounding region, though further excavations of Bronze Age layers are needed to propose Old Smyrna of that time as a Mycenaean settlement. In the 13th century BC, however, invasions from the Balkans (the so-called Sea Peoples) destroyed Troy VII, and Central and Western Anatolia as a whole fell into what is generally called the period of "Anatolian" and "Greek" Dark Ages of the Bronze Age collapse.

Old Smyrna 

At the dawn of İzmir's recorded history, Pausanias describes "evident tokens" such as "a port called after the name of Tantalus and a sepulcher of him by no means obscure", corresponding to the city's area and which have been tentatively located to date. The term "Old Smyrna" is used to describe the Archaic Period city located at Tepekule, Bayraklı, to make a distinction with the city of Smyrna rebuilt later on the slopes of Mount Pagos (present-day Kadifekale). The Greek settlement in Old Smyrna is attested by the presence of pottery dating from about 1000 BC onwards. The most ancient ruins preserved to our times date back to 725–700 BC. According to Herodotus the city was founded by Aeolians and later seized by Ionians. The oldest house discovered in Bayraklı has been dated to 925 and 900 BC. The walls of this well-preserved house, consisting of one small room typical of the Iron Age, were made of sun-dried bricks and the roof of the house was made of reeds.  A house found in Old Smyrna with two floors and five rooms with a courtyard, built in the second half of the 7th century BC, is the oldest known house having so many rooms under its roof. Around that time, people started to build thick, protective ramparts made of sun-dried bricks around the city. Smyrna was built on the Hippodamian system, in which streets run north-south and east-west and intersect at right angles, in a pattern familiar in the Near East but the earliest example in a western city. The houses all faced south. The most ancient paved streets in the Ionian civilization have also been discovered in ancient Smyrna. 

Homer, referred to as Melesigenes meaning "Child of the Meles Brook", is said to have been born in Smyrna in the 7th or 8th century BC. Combined with written evidence, it is generally admitted that Smyrna and Chios put forth the strongest arguments in claiming Homer and the main belief is that he was born in Ionia. A River Meles, still bearing the same name, is located within the city limits, although associations with the Homeric river is subject to controversy.

From the 7th century onwards, Smyrna achieved the identity of a city-state. About a thousand people lived inside the city walls, with others living in nearby villages, where fields, olive trees, vineyards, and the workshops of potters and stonecutters were located. People generally made their living from agriculture and fishing. The most important sanctuary of Old Smyrna was the Temple of Athena, which dates back to 640–580 BC and is partially restored today. Smyrna, by this point, was no longer a small town, but an urban center taking part in the Mediterranean trade. The city eventually became one of the twelve Ionian cities and was well on its way to becoming a foremost cultural and commercial center in the Mediterranean basin of that period, reaching its peak between 650–545 BC.

Lydian rule 

The city's port position near their capital drew the Lydians to Smyrna. The army of Lydia's Mermnad dynasty conquered the city sometime around 610–600 BC and is reported to have burned and destroyed parts of the city, although recent analyses on the remains in Bayraklı demonstrate that the temple had been in continuous use or was very quickly repaired under the Lydian rule.

Persian rule 
Soon afterwards, an invasion from outside Anatolia by the Persian Empire effectively ended Old Smyrna's history as an urban center of note. The Persian emperor Cyrus the Great attacked the coastal cities of the Aegean after conquering the capital of Lydia. As a result, Old Smyrna was destroyed in 545 BC.

Alexander the Great
Alexander the Great re-founded the city at a new location beyond the Meles River around 340 BC. Alexander had defeated the Persians in several battles and finally the Emperor Darius III himself at Issus in 333 BC. Old Smyrna on a small hill by the sea was large enough only for a few thousand people. Therefore, the slopes of Mount Pagos (Kadifekale) were chosen for the foundation of the new city, for which Alexander is credited, and this act laid the ground for a resurgence in the city's population.

Roman rule 

In 133 BC, Eumenes III, the last king of the Attalid dynasty of Pergamum, was about to die without an heir. In his will, he bequeathed his kingdom to the Roman Republic, and this included Smyrna. The city thus came under Roman rule as a civil diocese within the Province of Asia and enjoyed a new period of prosperity. Towards the close of the 1st century AD, Smyrna appeared as one of the seven churches of Asia (Revelation 2:9). Apostle John urged his followers to remain Christians:  "Be faithful to the point of death, and I will give you the crown of life" (Revelation 2:10).

Given the importance of the city, Roman emperors who came to Anatolia also visited Smyrna. In early AD 124, Emperor Hadrian visited Smyrna on his journeys across the Empire  and possibly Caracalla came in 214–215. Smyrna was a fine city with stone-paved streets.

In AD 178, the city was devastated by an earthquake. Emperor Marcus Aurelius contributed greatly to the rebuilding of the city. During this period the agora was restored. Many of the works of architecture from the city's pre-Turkish period date from this period.

After the Roman Empire was divided into two distinct entities, Smyrna became a territory of the Eastern Roman Empire. The city kept its status as a notable religious center in the early Byzantine period, but never returned to the Roman levels of prosperity.

Medieval period 

The Turks first captured Smyrna under the Seljuk commander Çaka Bey in 1076, along with Klazomenai, Foça and a number of the Aegean Islands. Çaka Bey (known as Tzachas among the Byzantines) used İzmir as a base for his naval operations. In 1097, the Byzantine commander John Doukas recovered the city and the neighboring region. The port city was then captured by the Knights of St John when Constantinople was conquered by the Crusaders during the Fourth Crusade in 1204, but the Nicaean Empire would reclaim possession of the city soon afterwards, albeit by according vast concessions to their Genoese allies who kept one of the city's castles and the lordship of the towns of Old Phocaea and New Phocaea (now part of the İzmir Province) from 1275 to 1340.

Smyrna was captured again by the Turks in the early 14th century. Umur Bey, the son of the founder of the Beylik of Aydın, took first the upper fort of Mount Pagos (thereafter called Kadifekale), and then the lower port castle of Neon Kastron (called St. Peter by the Genoese and as "Ok Kalesi" by the Turks). As Tzachas had done two centuries before, Umur Bey used the city as a base for naval raids. In 1344, a coalition of forces coordinated by Pope Clement VI took back the lower castle in a surprise attack in the Smyrniote crusades. A sixty-year period of uneasy cohabitation between the two powers, the Turks holding the upper castle and the Knights the lower, followed Umur Bey's death.

Ottoman rule 

The upper city of İzmir was captured from its Aydinid rulers by the Ottomans for the first time in 1389 during the reign of Bayezid I, who led his armies toward the five Western Anatolian Beyliks in the winter of the same year he had come to the throne. In 1402, however, Timur (Tamerlane) won the Battle of Ankara against the Ottomans, putting a serious check on the Ottoman state for the two following decades and handing back the territories of most of the Beyliks to their former ruling dynasties. Timur attacked and destroyed Smyrna and was responsible for the massacre of most of the Christian population, which constituted the vast majority in Smyrna. In 1415, Mehmet I took back İzmir for the Ottomans for the second time. With the death of the last bey of Aydın, İzmiroğlu Cüneyd Bey, in 1426 the city passed fully under Ottoman control. İzmir's first Ottoman governor was Alexander, a converted son of the Bulgarian Shishman dynasty. During the campaigns against Cüneyd, the Ottomans were assisted by the forces of the Knights Hospitaller who pressed the Sultan to return the port castle to them. However, the sultan refused to make this concession, despite the resulting tensions between the two camps, and he gave the Hospitallers permission to build a castle (the present-day Bodrum Castle) in Petronium (Bodrum) instead. 

In a landward-looking arrangement somewhat against its nature, the city and its present-day dependencies became an Ottoman sanjak (sub-province) either inside the larger vilayet (province) of Aydın part of the eyalet of Anatolia, with its capital in Kütahya or in "Cezayir" (i.e. "Islands" referring to "the Aegean Islands"). In the 15th century, two notable events for the city were a surprise Venetian raid in 1475 and the arrival of Sephardic Jews from Spain after 1492; they later made İzmir one of their principal urban centers in Ottoman lands. İzmir may have been a rather sparsely populated place in the 15th and 16th centuries, as indicated by the first extant Ottoman records describing the town and dating from 1528. In 1530, 304 adult males, both tax-paying and tax-exempt were on record, 42 of them Christians. There were five urban wards, one of these situated in the immediate vicinity of the port, rather active despite the town's small size and where the non-Muslim population was concentrated. By 1576, İzmir had grown to house 492 taxpayers in eight urban wards and had a number of dependent villages.  This corresponded to a total population estimated between 3500 and 5000.

International port city 

İzmir's remarkable growth began in the late 16th century when cotton and other products of the region brought French, English, Dutch and Venetian traders here.   With the privileged trading conditions accorded to foreigners in 1620 (these were the infamous capitulations that were later to cause a serious threat and setback for the Ottoman state in its decline), İzmir began to be one of the foremost trade centers of the Empire. Foreign consulates moved from Chios to the city by the early 17th century (1619 for the French Consulate, 1621 for the British), serving as trade centers for their nations. Each consulate had its own quay, where the ships under their flag would anchor. The long campaign for the conquest of Crete (22 years between 1648 and 1669) also considerably enhanced İzmir's position within the Ottoman realm since the city served as a port of dispatch and supply for the troops.

Despite facing a plague in 1676, an earthquake in 1688, and a great fire in 1743, the city continued to grow. By the end of the 17th century, the population was estimated at around ninety thousand, the Turks forming the majority (about 60,000); there were also 15,000 Greeks, 8,000 Armenians and 6,000 to 7,000 Jews, as well as a considerable section made up of French, English, Dutch and Italian merchants. In the meantime, the Ottomans had allowed İzmir's inner bay dominated by the port castle to silt up progressively (the location of the present-day Kemeraltı bazaar zone) and the port castle ceased to be of use.

In 1770, the Ottoman fleet was destroyed by Russian forces at the Battle of Çeşme, located near the city. This triggered fanatical Muslim groups to proceed to the massacre of c. 1,500 local Greeks. Later, in 1797 a riot resulting from the indiscipline of janissaries corps led to massive destruction of the Frankish merchant community and the killing of 1,500 members of the city's Greek community. In 1818, traveller William Jowett described the distribution of Smyrna (now Izmir)'s population: Turks 60,000, Greeks 40,000, Jews 10,000, Latins 3,000, Armenians 7,000.

The first railway lines to be built within the present-day territory of Turkey went from İzmir. A  İzmir-Aydın railway was started in 1856 and finished in 1867, a year later than the Smyrna-Cassaba Railway, itself started in 1863. In 1865 the population was estimated by the British (Hyde Clarke) at 180,000 with minorities of 80,000 Greeks, 8,000 Armenians and 10,000 Jews.The wide arc of the Smyrna-Cassaba line advancing in a wide arc to the north-west from İzmir, through the Karşıyaka suburb, contributed greatly to the development of the northern shores as urban areas. These new developments, typical of the industrial age and the way the city attracted merchants and middlemen gradually changed the demographic structure of the city, its culture and its Ottoman character. In 1867, İzmir finally became the center of its own vilayet, still called by neighboring Aydın's name but with its own administrative area covering a large part of Turkey's present-day Aegean Region.

In the late 19th century, the port was threatened by a build-up of silt in the gulf and an initiative, unique in the history of the Ottoman Empire, was undertaken in 1886. In order to redirect the silt, the bed of the Gediz River was redirected to its present-day northern course, so that it no longer flowed into the gulf. The beginning of the 20th century saw İzmir take on the look of a global metropolis with a cosmopolitan city center. According to the 1893 Ottoman census, more than half of the population was Turkish, with 133,800 Greeks, 9,200 Armenians, 17,200 Jews, and 54,600 foreign nationals. According to author Katherine Flemming, by 1919, Smyrna's 150,000 Greeks made up just under half of the population, outnumbering the Turks in the city two to one, while the American Consul General, George Horton, records 165,000 Turks, 150,000 Greeks, 25,000 Jews, 25,000 Armenians, and 20,000 foreigners (Italians, French, British, Americans). According to Henry Morgenthau and Trudy Ring, before World War I, the Greeks alone numbered 130,000, out of a total population of 250,000. Moreover, according to various scholars, prior to the war, the city hosted more Greeks than Athens, the capital of Greece.  The Ottoman ruling class of that era referred to the city as Infidel Smyrna (Gavur İzmir) due to its strong Greek presence.

Modern times 

Following the defeat of the Ottoman Empire in World War I, the victors had, for a time, intended to carve up large parts of Anatolia into respective zones of influence and offered the western regions of Turkey to Greece under the Treaty of Sèvres. On 15 May 1919, the Greek Army landed in Smyrna, but the Greek expedition towards central Anatolia was disastrous for both that country and for the local Greeks of Anatolia. By September 1922 the Greek army had been defeated and was in full retreat, the last Greek soldiers leaving Smyrna on 8 September 1922.

The Turkish Army retook possession of the city on 9 September 1922, effectively ending the Greco-Turkish War (1919–1922). Four days later, on 13 September 1922, a great fire broke out in the city, lasting until .  The fire completely destroyed the Greek and Armenian quarters, while the Muslim and Jewish quarters escaped damage. Estimated Greek and Armenians deaths resulting from the fire range from 10,000 to 100,000 Approximately 50,000 to 400,000 Greek and Armenian refugees crammed the waterfront to escape from the fire and were forced to remain there under harsh conditions for nearly two weeks. The systematic evacuation of Greeks on the quay started on 24 September when the first Greek ships entered the harbor under the supervision of Allied destroyers. Some 150,000 to 200,000 Greeks were evacuated in total.  The remaining Greeks left for Greece in 1923, as part of the population exchange between Greece and Turkey, a stipulation of the Treaty of Lausanne, which formally ended the Greco-Turkish War.

The war, and especially the events that took place in İzmir, such as the fire, probably the greatest disaster the city has ever experienced, continue to influence the psyches of the two nations to this day. The Turks have claimed that the Greek army landing was marked from the very first day by the "first bullet" fired on Greek detachments by the journalist Hasan Tahsin and the bayonetting to death of Colonel Fethi Bey and his unarmed soldiers in the city's historic barracks (Sarı Kışla — the Yellow Barracks), for refusing to shout "Zito o Venizelos ("Long Live Venizelos"). The Greeks, on the other hand, have cited the numerous atrocities committed by the Turkish soldiers against the Greeks and Armenians (locals or hinterland refugees) in İzmir. These include the lynching of the Orthodox Metropolitan Chrysostomos following the recapture of the city on 9 September 1922 and the slaughter of Armenian and Greek males, who were then sent to the so-called labour battalions.  The city was, once again, gradually rebuilt after the proclamation of the Turkish Republic in 1923.

In 2020, the city was damaged by the Aegean Sea earthquake and tsunami, which was the deadliest seismic event in that year. 117 people died and 1,034 more were injured in Turkey, all but one of whom were from the city of İzmir.

Today, the city of İzmir is composed of several metropolitan districts. Of these, the district of Konak corresponds to historical İzmir, with this district's area having constituted the city's central "İzmir Municipality" until 1984. With the formation of the "İzmir Metropolitan Municipality", the city of İzmir at first grouped together its eleven (initially nine) urban districts – namely Balçova, Bayraklı, Bornova, Buca, Çiğli, Gaziemir, Güzelbahçe, Karabağlar, Karşıyaka, Konak, and Narlıdere – and later consolidated them with an additional nine of the province's districts outside the city proper. In 2013, the passing of Act 6360 established all thirty of İzmir Province's districts as part of İzmir's metropolitan area.

Demographics 

The period after the 1960s and the 1970s saw another blow to the fabric of İzmir, when local administrations tended to neglect İzmir's traditional values and landmarks. For many inhabitants, this was as serious as the 1922 fire. Some administrators were not always in tune with the central government in Ankara and regularly fell short of government subsidies, and the city absorbed huge waves of immigration from inland Anatolia, causing a population explosion. Today, it is not surprising that many inhabitants of İzmir (similar to residents of other prominent Turkish cities) look back with nostalgia to a cozier, more manageable city, which came to an end in the last few decades.

The Floor Ownership Law of 1965 (Kat Mülkiyeti Kanunu), allowing and encouraging arrangements between house or land proprietors and building contractors by which each would share the benefits of renting out eight-floor apartment blocks built to replace former single-family houses, proved especially disastrous for the urban landscape.

Modern İzmir is growing in several directions at the same time. The north-western corridor extending to Aliağa brings together both mass housing projects, including villa-type projects and intensive industrial area, including an oil refinery. In the southern corridor towards Gaziemir yet another important growth trend is observed, contributed to by the Aegean Free Zone, light industry, the airport and mass housing projects. The presence of the Tahtalı Dam, built to provide drinking water, and its protected zone did not check urban spread here, which has offshoots in cooperatives outside the metropolitan area as far south as the Ayrancılar–Torbalı axis.

To the east and the north-east, urban development ends near the natural barriers constituted respectively by the Belkahve (Mount Nif) and Sabuncubeli (Mount Yamanlar-Mount Sipylus) passes. But the settlements both above Bornova, inside the metropolitan zone, and around Kemalpaşa and Ulucak, outside the metropolitan zone, see mass housing and secondary residences development.

More recently, the metropolitan area displays growth, especially along the western corridor, encouraged by the Çeşme motorway and extending to districts outside the city of İzmir proper, such as Seferihisar and Urla.
The population of the city is predominantly Muslim, but it was predominantly non-Muslim up to the earlier quarter of the 20th century.

İzmir is also home to Turkey's second largest Jewish community after Istanbul, numbering about 2,500. The community is still concentrated in their traditional quarter of Karataş. Smyrniot Jews like Sabbatai Zevi and Darío Moreno were among famous figures in the city's Jewish community.  Others include the Pallache family with three grand rabbis: Haim, Abraham, and Nissim.

The Catholic Levantines of İzmir, who are mostly of Genoese and to a lesser degree of French and Venetian descent, live mainly in the districts of Bornova and Buca. One of the most prominent present-day figures of the community is Caroline Giraud Koç, wife of the renowned Turkish industrialist Mustafa Koç, whose company, Koç Holding, is one of the largest family-owned industrial conglomerates in the world.

İzmir once had a large Greek and Armenian community, but after the great fire of 1922 and the end of the Greco-Turkish War, many of the Christians remaining in the city fled or were transferred to Greece under the terms of the 1923 population exchange between Greece and Turkey.

Climate 

Although it is rare, snow can fall in İzmir from December to February, which usually stays for a few hours rather than a whole day or more. The record  of snow depth was recorded on January 31, 1945. Frost does occasionally occur at night almost every winter.

Etesian winds (Turkish: meltem, Greek: μελτέμι meltemi) of the Aegean Sea occur regularly in the Gulf and city of İzmir.

Main sights 

Standing on Mount Yamanlar, the tomb of Tantalus was excavated by Charles Texier in 1835 and is an example of the historic traces in the region prior to the Hellenistic Age, along with those found in nearby Kemalpaşa and Mount Sipylus.

The Agora of Smyrna is well preserved, and is arranged into the Agora Open Air Museum of İzmir, although important parts buried under modern buildings wait to be brought to light. Serious consideration is also being given to uncovering the ancient theatre of Smyrna where St. Polycarp was martyred, buried under an urban zone on the slopes of Kadifekale. It was distinguishable until the 19th century, as evident by the sketches done at the time. At top of the same hill stands an ancient castle, one of İzmir's landmarks.

One of the more pronounced elements of İzmir's harbor is the Clock Tower, a marble tower in the middle of the Konak district, standing  in height. It was designed by Levantine French architect Raymond Charles Père in 1901 to commemorate the 25th anniversary of the ascension of Abdülhamid II to the Ottoman throne in 1876. The tower features four fountains placed around the base in a circular pattern, and the columns are inspired by North African themes.

The Kemeraltı bazaar zone set up by the Ottomans, combined with the Agora, rests near the slopes of Kadifekale. İzmir has had three castles historically – Kadifekale (Pagos), the portuary Ok Kalesi (Neon Kastron, St. Peter), and Sancakkale, which remained vital to İzmir's security for centuries. Sancakkale is situated in the present-day İnciraltı quarter between the Balçova and Narlıdere districts, on the southern shore of the Gulf of İzmir. It is at a key point where the strait allows entry into the innermost tip of the Gulf at its narrowest, and due to shallow waters through a large part of this strait, ships have sailed close to the castle.

There are nine synagogues in İzmir, concentrated either in the traditional Jewish quarter of Karataş or in Havra Sokak (Synagogue street) in Kemeraltı, and they all bear the signature of the 19th century when they were built or re-constructed in depth on the basis of former buildings.

The Atatürk Mask is a large concrete relief of the head of Mustafa Kemal Atatürk, founder of modern Turkey, located to the south of Kadifekale the historical castle of İzmir.

The İzmir Bird Paradise (İzmir Kuş Cenneti) in Çiğli, a bird sanctuary near Karşıyaka, has 205 recorded species of birds, including 63 species that are resident year-round, 54 species of summer migratory birds, 43 species of winter migratory birds, and 30 transient species. 56 species of birds have bred in the park. The sanctuary, which covers 80 square kilometres, was registered as "the protected area for water birds and for their breeding" by the Turkish Ministry of Forestry in 1982. A large open-air zoo was established in the same district of Çiğli in 2008 under the name Sasalı Park of Natural Life.

Culture

İzmir International Fair 

İzmir prides itself with its busy schedule of trade fairs, exhibitions and congresses. The fair and the festival are held in the compound of İzmir's vast inner city park named Kültürpark in the first days of September, and organized by İZFAŞ, a depending company of İzmir Metropolitan Municipality.

Festivals 

The annual International İzmir Festival, which begins in mid-June and continues until mid-July, has been organized every year since 1987. During the festival, many world-class performers such as soloists and virtuosi, orchestras, dance companies, rock and jazz groups have given recitals and performances at various venues in the city and its surrounding areas; including the ancient theatres at Ephesus (near Selçuk) and Metropolis (an ancient Ionian city situated near the town of Torbalı.) The festival is a member of the European Festivals Association since 2003.

The İzmir European Jazz Festival is among the numerous events organized every year by the İKSEV (İzmir Foundation for Culture, Arts and Education) since 1994. The festival aims to bring together masters and lovers of jazz with the aim to generate feelings of love, friendship and peace.

The International İzmir Short Film Festival is organized since 1999 and is a member of the European Coordination of Film Festivals.

İzmir Metropolitan Municipality has built the Ahmet Adnan Saygun Art Center on a 21,000 m2 land plot in the Güzelyalı district, in order to contribute to the city's culture and art life. The acoustics of the center have been prepared by ARUP which is a noted company in this field.

Music 
In 2015 the Barış Youth Symphony Orchestra was founded, incorporating children with limited opportunities in low-income regions of the city, with the purpose to keep them away from crime on the street. The orchestra, grown up to nearly one hundred members, gives concerts accompanied by notable classic music artists.

Cuisine 
İzmir's cuisine has largely been affected by its multicultural history, hence the large variety of food originating from the Aegean and Mediterranean regions. Population movement from Eastern and South East Anatolia regions has enriched the local cuisine. Another factor is the large and fertile area of land surrounding the region which grows a rich selection of vegetables. There is considerable culinary usage of green leaf vegetables and wild plants amongst the residents, especially those with insular heritage, such as the immigrants from Crete. Some of the common dishes found here are the tarhana soup (made from dried yoghurt and tomatoes), "İzmir" köfte, sulu köfte, keşkek (boiled wheat with meat), zerde (sweetened rice with saffron) and mücver (made from zucchine and eggs). A Sephardic contribution to the Turkish cuisine, boyoz and lokma are pastries associated with İzmir. Kumru is a special kind of sandwich that is associated particularly with the Çeşme district and features cheese and tomato in its basics, with sucuk also added sometimes.

Economy 

The port of Izmir is Turkey's main port for exports in terms of the freight handled and its free zone is the leader among the twenty in Turkey.

Trade through the city's port had a determinant importance for the economy of the Ottoman Empire at the beginning of the 19th century and the economic foundations of the early decades of Turkey's Republican era were also laid here during the İzmir Economic Congress.

At present, İzmir area's economy is divided in value between various types of activities, as follows: 30.5% for industry, 22.9% for trade and related services, 13.5% for transportation and communication and 7.8% for agriculture. In 2008, İzmir provided 10.5% of all tax revenues collected by Turkey and its exports corresponded to 6% and its imports to 4% of Turkey's foreign trade.

The province as a whole is Turkey's third largest exporter after Istanbul and Bursa, and the fifth largest importer. 85–90% of the region's exports and approximately one fifth of all Turkish exports are made through the Port of Alsancak with an annual container loading capacity of close to a million.

Sports 

Several important international sports events have been held in İzmir:
 26–28 April 2013 – 2012–13 FIBA EuroChallenge Final Four,
 18–19 June 2011 – 2011 European Team Championships First League,
 28 August – 2 September 2010 –  Group D of the 2010 FIBA World Championship,
 3–13 September 2009 – Groups A, C, E, Semifinals & Final of the 2009 Men's European Volleyball Championship,
 7–11 May 2008 – The 7th WTF World Junior Taekwondo Championship,
 4–9 July 2006 – The 2006 European Seniors Fencing Championship,
 14–23 July 2006 – The U20 European Basketball Championship for Men,
 7–22 August 2005 – The 2005 Summer Universiade, the International University Sports Games,
 2–7 September 2005 – Preliminary games of the 2005 European Women's Basketball Championship,
 6–17 October 1971 – The 1971 Mediterranean Games.

The 51,295 capacity (all-seater) İzmir Atatürk Stadium regularly hosts, apart from Turkish Super League games of İzmir-based teams, many other Super League and Turkish Cup derby matches.

The three big football clubs in İzmir are Altay (42 seasons in Süper Lig), Göztepe (30 seasons in Süper Lig), and Karşıyaka (16 seasons in Süper Lig). Other notable football clubs include: Altınordu, Menemenspor, Ci Group Buca, Bucaspor, and İzmirspor. Bucaspor were relegated from the top tier, Turkish Super League, at the end of the 2010–11 season.

Göztepe made sports history in Turkey by having played the semi-finals of the Inter-Cities Fairs Cup (which later became the UEFA Cup) in the 1968–69 season, and the quarter-finals of the UEFA Cup Winners' Cup in the 1969–70 season; becoming the first ever Turkish football club to play a semi-final game in Europe and the only one for two decades, until Galatasaray reached the semi-finals of the 1988–89 European Cup.

Göztepe and Altay have won the Turkish Cup twice for İzmir and all of İzmir's teams have periodically jumped in and out of Süper Lig. Historically, İzmir is also the birthplace of two Greek sports clubs, namely the multi-sport club Panionios and association football club Apollon Smyrni F.C. which were founded in the city and moved to Athens after 1922.

Karşıyaka's basketball department Karşıyaka Basket won the Turkish Basketball League twice (in the 1986–87 and 2014–15 seasons), the Turkish Cup once (in the 2013–14 season) and the Presidential Cup twice (in 1987 and 2014). The team plays its games at the Karşıyaka Arena. The 10,000 capacity (all-seater) Halkapınar Sports Hall is currently İzmir's largest indoor sports arena and was among the venues of the 2010 FIBA World Championship in Turkey.

Arkas Spor is a successful volleyball club in the city, having won the Turkish Men's Volleyball League and the Turkish Cup several times, and the CEV Challenge Cup in the 2008–09 season. İzmir Atatürk Volleyball Hall regularly hosts the games of the city's volleyball teams.

The city boasts of several sports legends, past and present. Already at the dawn of its history, notable natives such as the son of its first port's founder Pelops had attained fame and kingdom with a chariot race and Onomastus is one of history's first recorded sportspeople, having won the boxing contest in the Olympiad of 688 BC.

Born in İzmir, and nicknamed Taçsız Kral (The Uncrowned King), 1960s football star Metin Oktay is a legend in Turkey. Oktay became the first notable Turkish footballer to play abroad, with Palermo in Italy's Serie A, during the 1961–1962 season. Two other notable football figures from İzmir are Alpay Özalan and Mustafa Denizli, the first having played for Aston Villa F.C. between 2000 and 2003 and the second, after a long playing career as the captain of İzmir's Altay S.K., still pursues a successful career as a coach, being the only manager in Turkish Super League history to win a championship title with each of Istanbul's "Big Three" clubs (Galatasaray, Fenerbahçe S.K., and Beşiktaş J.K.) and having guided the Turkish national football team to the UEFA Euro 2000 Quarter-Finals.

İzmir Metropolitan Municipality (İBB) Sports Club's ice hockey team began playing in the Turkish Ice Hockey Super League during the 2011–2012 season

Politics 

The current Mayor of the İzmir Metropolitan Municipality is Tunç Soyer from the Republican People's Party (CHP), in office since 2019.  His predecessor, the previous mayor Aziz Kocaoğlu (CHP) was first elected in 2004, and he was re-elected in both 2009 and 2014.

İzmir has traditionally been a stronghold for the CHP, the centre-left Kemalist political party which forms the main opposition in the Grand National Assembly of Turkey. Being the third largest city in Turkey, İzmir is viewed as the CHP's most prized electoral stronghold, since the party has a more limited support base in both Istanbul and Ankara. Since the right-wing Justice and Development Party (AKP) gained power in 2002, the electorate of İzmir has been notable for voting strongly in favour of the CHP in every general and local election. In the 2007 and 2010 and 2017 referendums, the İzmir electorate strongly rejected the AKP government's constitutional reform proposals. Almost all of the city's districts have returned strong pluralities or majorities for the CHP in past elections, although the party lost ground in the 2014 local elections.

Due to the economic and historical importance of the city, İzmir has long been a strategic electoral target for the AKP, since beating the CHP in their most significant stronghold would be politically substantial. The majority of the citizens in İzmir have continued to vote for the centre-left political parties (in particular the CHP), despite large-scale pledges by the AKP promising investment and new infrastructure. For general elections, İzmir returns 28 members of parliament to the Grand National Assembly of Turkey. The province is split into two electoral districts which roughly divide the city into a northern and southern district, each electing 14 MPs. Anti-government protests in 2013 and 2014 against the AKP were particularly strong in İzmir.

During the 2014 presidential election, 58.64% of the city's electorate voted for the CHP candidate Ekmeleddin İhsanoğlu. In contrast, the AKP candidate Recep Tayyip Erdoğan received 33.38% of the vote. The pro-Kurdish candidate Selahattin Demirtaş received 7.98%.

Media 
Izmir has its own local media companies: there are 9 TV channels headquartered in İzmir and broadcasting in the Aegean Region, 26 local radio stations and 15 local newspapers. TRT Belgesel (TRT Documentary) is a Turkish national TV channel broadcasting from the TRT building in Izmir.

TV channels broadcasting in Izmir 

▪Ege TV |Local TV ▪Kanal 35 |Local TV ▪Sky TV | Local TV ▪Kordon TV | Local TV ▪FRM TV | Online TV ▪Ege Üniversitesi TV |Local TV ▪Ben TV | Online TV Ben TV - Ege ve İzmir Haberleri, Güncel Haberler▪Yenigün TV | Online TV ▪TRT Belgesel | National TV

Local radio stations

▪Radyo İzmir ▪Romantik Radyo ▪Romantik Türk ▪Radyo 35 ▪Kordon FM ▪İmbat FM ▪Radyo Kordelya ▪Radyo Efe ▪Oynak FM ▪Duygusal FM ▪Sky Radyo ▪Radyo Pause ▪Radyo Ege ▪Ege FM ▪Ege'nin Sesi Radyosu ▪Herkül FM ▪Can Radyo ▪Batı Radyo ▪Radyo Gökkuşağı ▪Yıldız FM ▪Buca FM ▪Radyo Ege Kampüs 100.8 ▪Rock City FM ▪öRT FM ▪Y.Tire FM ▪DEÜ FM

Newspapers and magazines 

▪Ege Telgraf ▪Ekonomik Çözüm ▪Gözlem ▪Haber Ekspres ▪Ticaret ▪ Gazete Yenigün  ▪Yeni Asır ▪Yeni Ekonomi ▪Yenigün Gazetesi ▪9 Eylül Gazetesi ▪Küçük Menderes Gazetesi ▪Büyük Tire ▪Ege Gazetesi Tüm adresleri tek adreste

Izmir in notable literary and artistic works 

 The play L'impresario delle Smirne by Carlo Goldoni (1759).
 The poem "The Turkish Captive" in the poetry volume Les Orientales by Victor Hugo (1828). 
 The solo piano piece "In Smyrna" by Edward Elgar (1905).
 The novel Mask of Dimitrios, Eric Ambler (1939)
 The film You Can't Win 'Em All, directed by Leo Gordon and starring Tony Curtis and Charles Bronson (1970).
 The travel book Scotch and Holy Water, John D. Tumpane (1981)
 The novel Farewell Anatolia, Dido Sotiriou (1962)
 The novel İzmir, E. Howard Hunt (2006)
 The novel Middlesex, Jeffrey Eugenides (2002)
 The novel/TV series The Witches of Smyrna by Mara Meimaridi (2004).
 The novel Birds Without Wings, Louis de Bernières (2005)

Health 

Air pollution in Turkey is a problem in the city, in part due to vehicle exhaust: a 2020 study of coal-fired residential heating estimated the cost of replacing it versus the reduction in illness and premature death. There are 21 public hospitals in Izmir. The healthcare system in Turkey consists of a mix of public and private hospitals. Turkey also has a universal health care insurance system (SGK) which provides medical treatment free of charge in public hospitals to residents registered with a Turkish identity card number. One of the largest hospitals in the Aegean Region is currently under construction in the Bayraklı district of İzmir, with a reported cost of 780 million Euros.

Education 
There are a total of nine active universities in and near İzmir. The city is also home to well-rooted higher-education establishments that are renowned across Turkey, such as the İzmir Anatolian Vocational High School of Commerce (İzmir Anadolu Ticaret Lisesi) established in 1854, and the American Collegiate Institute (ACI) which was established in 1878.

Historically, during the late 19th and early 20th centuries, the city was an educational center of the Greek world, with a total of 67 male and 4 female schools. The most important Greek educational institution was the Evangelical School which operated from 1733 to 1922.

İzmir is also home to the third U.S. Space Camp in the world, Space Camp Turkey.

Universities established in İzmir 

 Ionian University, the first university of the city, established in 1920. It was organized by the Greek mathematician and close friend of Albert Einstein, Constantin Carathéodory, on the instructions of the Greek government. However, it never operated due to the developments of the Greco-Turkish War.
 Ege University – Founded in 1955.
 Dokuz Eylül University – Founded in 1982.
 İzmir University of Economics – Founded as a private sector initiative in 2002 by the İzmir Chamber of Commerce, İzmir University of Economics is a specialized university with a campus in the metropolitan district of Balçova.
 Yaşar University – Founded in 2001 by Yaşar Holding, the School of Foreign Languages is located in the central Alsancak neighborhood, while the main Selcuk Yasar campus is located in Bornova.
 University of İzmir – Founded in 2007, closed in 2016.
 İzmir Kâtip Çelebi University – Founded in 2010.
 Şifa University – Founded in 2010, closed in 2016.
 İzmir Democracy University – Founded in 2016.
 İzmir Tınaztepe University – Founded in 2018.

Universities established near İzmir

 İzmir Institute of Technology – Founded in 1992, İzmir Institute of Technology is the city's first institute of technology, while the campus, which is Turkey's largest, is located in the nearby district of Urla.
 University of Gediz  – Founded in 2009, it was located in the nearby district of Menemen. The university had another campus in Çankaya district. There was a medical campus project in Çiğli district. It was closed in 2016.
 İzmir Bakırçay University – Founded in 2016.

International schools in İzmir
 Deutsche Schule Izmir (German school)
 Scuola Primaria e dell'Infanzia Italiana di Smirne (Italian school)

Transport

İzmir is served by domestic and international flights through the Adnan Menderes International Airport and by modern rapid transit systems serving the entirety of İzmir's metropolitan area. The city has attracted investors through its strategic location and its relatively new and highly developed technological infrastructure in transportation, telecommunications, and energy.

Inter-city transport

Air 
The Adnan Menderes International Airport (ADB) is well served with connections to Turkish and international destinations. It is located in the Gaziemir district of İzmir.

Bus 
A large bus terminal, the Otogar in the Pınarbaşı neighborhood of the city, has intercity buses to destinations across Turkey. Bus companies' shuttle services pick up customers from each of their branch offices scattered across the city at regular intervals, often free of charge. To facilitate easier access, a Halkapınar—Otogar metro line has long been deliberated but construction has never begun – though throughout his campaign and upon his election as mayor of İzmir in 2019, Tunç Soyer has outlined it as one of his priorities.

Rail 

İzmir has two historical rail terminals in the city center. Alsancak Terminal, built in 1858, and Basmane Terminal, built in 1866, are the two main railway stations of the city. The Turkish State Railways operates regional service to Ödemiş, Tire, Selçuk, Aydın, Söke, Nazilli, Denizli and Uşak, as well as longer-distance intercity service to Ankara, Afyon and Bandırma (and from there to Istanbul via İDO connection).

Inner-city transport 
Coordinated public transportation was introduced to İzmir in 1999. A body known as UKOME gives strategic direction to the Metro, the ESHOT bus division, ferry operations, utilities and road developments. İzmir has an electronic, integrated pre-pay ticket known as the İzmirim Kart ('My Izmir' Card). The card is valid on all metro and commuter rail lines, buses, ferries, trams, and in certain other municipal facilities.  The İzmirim Kart allows for the use of multiple forms of transport within a 90-minute window, combining for a single fare price.

Bus 
All of İzmir's major districts are serviced by a dense, comprehensive municipal bus network under the name ESHOT. The acronym stands for "E elektrik (electricity); S su (water); H havagazı (gas); O otobüs (bus) and T troleybüs (trolleybus)." Electricity, water and gas are now supplied by separate undertakings, and İzmir's trolleybus system ceased to operate in 1992. However, the bus company has inherited the original name. ESHOT operates 322 lines with about 1,500 buses and a staff of 2,700. It has five garages at Karataş, Gümrük, Basmane, Yeşilyurt, and Konak. A privately owned company, İzulaş, operates 400 buses from two garages, running services under contract for ESHOT. These scheduled services are supplemented by the privately owned minibus or dolmuş services.

Urban ferries 

Taken over by İzmir Metropolitan Municipality since 2000 and operated within the structure of their private subsidiary company (İzdeniz), İzmir's urban ferry services for passengers and vehicles are very much a part of the life of the city's inhabitants. 24 ferries shuttle between 9 quays (clockwise: Bostanlı, Karşıyaka, Bayraklı, Alsancak, Pasaport, Konak, Karantina, Göztepe and Üçkuyular.) Special lines to points further out in the gulf are also put in service during summer, transporting excursion or holiday makers. These services are cheap and it is not unusual to see natives or visitors taking a ferry ride simply as a pastime.

= Metro= 

İzmir has a metro network that is constantly being extended with new stations being put in service. The "İzmir Metro" network, currently consisting of one main line, starts from the Fahrettin Altay station in Balçova in the western portion of the metropolitan area and runs northeast through the city to Bornova.

Regional rail 

İZBAN, formerly known as Egeray, is a commuter rail system connecting metropolitan and suburban area of İzmir. It is the busiest commuter railway in Turkey, serving about 150,000 passengers daily. İZBAN is a portmanteau of the words "İzmir" and "Banliyö".

İZBAN A.Ş. operates the railway and is owned 50% by the Turkish State Railways and 50% by the İzmir Metropolitan Municipality.

Tram 

İzmir's latest tram system is owned by the metropolitan municipality and operated by İzmir Metro A.Ş. in two independent lines – one in Karşıyaka, opened in 2017, and the other in Konak, opened in 2018.

Public transportation statistics 
The average amount of time people spend commuting with public transit in İzmir, for example to and from work on a weekday is 62 minutes, and 13% of public transit riders ride for more than 2 hours every day. The average amount of time people wait at a stop or station for public transit is 15 minutes, while 27% of riders wait for over 20 minutes on average every day. The average distance people usually ride in a single trip with public transit is 10.4 km, while 22% travel for over 12 km in a single direction.

Notable people

Twin towns and sister cities 
The following is a list of İzmir's sister cities:

Europe 
 Ancona, Italy, (Cooperation Agreement) since 2005
 Bălți, Moldova, since 1996
 Bremen, Germany, since 1993
 Constanța, Romania, since 1995
 Famagusta, Cyprus / Northern Cyprus 
 Kardzhali, Bulgaria, since 2008
 Mostar, Bosnia and Herzegovina, since 1996
 North Nicosia, Cyprus / Northern Cyprus, since 2019 
 Odense, Denmark, since 1991
 Plzeň, Czech Republic, since 1987
 Sarajevo, Bosnia and Herzegovina, since 2022
 Split, Croatia, since 1996
 Turin, Italy, (Goodwill Agreement) since 2012
 Volgograd, Russia, since 2006

Asia 
 Baku, Azerbaijan, since 1985
 Bishkek, Kyrgyzstan, since 1991
 Mumbai, India, since 1997
 Shymkent, Kazakhstan (Cooperation Agreement) since 2004
 Bukhara, Uzbekistan (Cooperation Agreement) since 1992
 Tel Aviv, Israel, since 1996
 Tianjin, China, since 1990
 Türkmenabat, Turkmenistan, since 1994
 Wuhan, Hubei, China, since 2013
 Xiamen, Fujian, China, since 2018

Africa 
 Sousse, Tunisia, since 2006
 Cape Town, South Africa, (Cooperation Agreement) since 2014

Americas 
 Havana, Cuba, since 1996
 Tampa, Florida, United States, since 1990
 Long Beach, California, United States, since 2004
 São Paulo, Brazil, since 2007

See also 

 Pasaport Terminal
 IAOIZ
 List of people from Izmir
 List of museums in Izmir
 List of parks in İzmir
 List of hospitals in Izmir Province
 List of mayors of İzmir
 List of Ottoman mosques in Izmir
 Yeni Kavaflar Market

İzmir Metropolitian Municipality mayors 
 1984-1989 Burhan Özfatura ANAP
 1989-1991 Yüksel Çakmur SHP
 1991-1994 Yüksel Çakmur DSP
 1994-1999 Burhan Özfatura DYP
 1999-2002 Ahmet Piriştina DSP
 2002-2004 Ahmet Piriştina CHP
 2004-2019 Aziz Kocaoğlu CHP
 2019-since Tunç Soyer CHP

Notes

References

Further reading 
 Atay, Çinar. "Once upon a Time, İzmir", Skyline (Istanbul), no. 172 (Nov. 1997), pp. 62–64, 66, 68, [70], 72. N.B.: Amply ill. with reproductions of 19th-century black and white photos.

 Philip Mansel, Levant: Splendour and Catastrophe on the Mediterranean, London, John Murray, 11 November 2010, hardback, 480 pages, New Haven, Yale University Press, 24 May 2011, hardback, 470 pages,

External links 

 İzmir City Portal
 Visit İzmir

 
Populated coastal places in Turkey
Roman sites in Turkey
New Testament cities
Aegean Sea port cities and towns in Turkey
World Heritage Tentative List for Turkey